The 2021–22 Moldovan "A" Division was the 31st season of Moldovan football's second-tier league. The season started on 30 July 2021 and ended on 13 May 2022.

Teams

Season summary

League table

Results
Teams will play each other twice (once home, once away).

Results by round
The following table represents the teams game results in each round.

Top goalscorers

Clean sheets

Notes

References

External links
Divizia A - Moldova - Results, fixtures, tables and news - divizia-a.md

Moldovan Liga 1 seasons
Moldova 2
2021–22 in Moldovan football